The 2014 Judo Grand Prix Ulaanbaatar was held in Ulaanbaatar, Mongolia from 4 to 6 July 2014.

Medal summary

Men's events

Women's events

Source Results

Medal table

References

External links
 

2014 IJF World Tour
2014 Judo Grand Prix
IJF World Tour Ulaanbaatar
Judo
Grand Prix 2014
Judo
Judo
Judo